This is a list of academic journals published by Dove Medical Press. Journals marked with a † were no longer in publication as of March 2019.

A

B

C

D

E

G

H

I

J

L

M

N

O

P

R

S

T

V

External links
List of journals on Dove Medical Press website

Dove Medical Press